Clarence Charles Percy Abbott (9 November 1888 – 12 June 1963) was an Australian rules football player who played three games in the Victorian Football League (VFL). In 1907, he played two games for the Collingwood Football Club and subsequently he played with both Brunswick and Essendon Association in the Victorian Football Association. In 1912, he returned to the VFL and played one game for the Melbourne Football Club.

References

External links

Clarrie Abbott's playing statistics from The VFA Project
Clarrie Abbott's profile at Demonwiki

1888 births
Australian rules footballers from Victoria (Australia)
Collingwood Football Club players
Brunswick Football Club players
Essendon Association Football Club players
Melbourne Football Club players
1963 deaths